Statistics of Empress's Cup in the 2008 season.

Overview
It was contested by 32 teams, and Nippon TV Beleza won the championship.

Results

1st round
Nagoya FC 1-2 Osaka University of Health and Sport Sciences
Nippon Sport Science University 4-0 Fukui University of Technology Fukui High School
Renaissance Kumamoto FC 1-6 Nippon TV Menina
Fukuoka J. Anclas 2-6 Shimizudaihachi Pleiades
Bucchigiri FC 0-8 Waseda University
Hinomoto Gakuen High School 3-1 Shizuoka Sangyo University
JFA Academy Fukushima 2-0 Hokkaido Bunkyo University Meisei High School
Anclas FC Paso Dorad 1-2 Sakuyo High School

2nd round
Ohara Gakuen JaSRA 1-0 Osaka University of Health and Sport Sciences
Nippon Sport Science University 3-0 Tokiwagi Gakuken High School
Kibi International University 0-0 (pen 3-5) Nippon TV Menina
Shimizudaihachi Pleiades 1-5 JEF United Chiba
AS Elfen Sayama FC 2-3 Waseda University
Hinomoto Gakuen High School 0-1 Speranza FC Takatsuki
Bunnys Kyoto SC 6-5 JFA Academy Fukushima
Sakuyo High School 0-7 Hoo High School

3rd round
Nippon TV Beleza 3-0 Ohara Gakuen JaSRA
Nippon Sport Science University 0-1 Iga FC Kunoichi
TEPCO Mareeze 7-0 Nippon TV Menina
JEF United Chiba 1-1 (pen 5-6) Okayama Yunogo Belle
Urawa Reds 3-0 Waseda University
Speranza FC Takatsuki 0-2 Tasaki Perule FC
Albirex Niigata 6-1 Bunnys Kyoto SC
Hoo High School 1-4 INAC Leonessa

Quarterfinals
Nippon TV Beleza 4-0 Iga FC Kunoichi
TEPCO Mareeze 3-2 Okayama Yunogo Belle
Urawa Reds 0-1 Tasaki Perule FC
Albirex Niigata 1-3 INAC Leonessa

Semifinals
Tasaki Perule FC 1-4 INAC Leonessa
Nippon TV Beleza 3-1 TEPCO Mareeze

Final
Nippon TV Beleza 4-1 INAC Leonessa
Nippon TV Beleza won the championship.

References

Empress's Cup
2008 in Japanese women's football